is a Japanese football player. He plays for YSCC Yokohama.

Career
Takuya Miyamoto joined J2 League club Mito HollyHock in 2016.

Club statistics
Updated to January 1, 2021.

References

External links
Profile at Mito HollyHock

1993 births
Living people
Waseda University alumni
Association football people from Chiba Prefecture
Japanese footballers
J2 League players
J3 League players
Mito HollyHock players
YSCC Yokohama players
Fujieda MYFC players
Association football forwards